Zah Rahan Krangar (born on 7 March 1985) is a Liberian professional footballer who plays as a midfielder. He has also played for the Liberia national team.

Club career

Early career
Zah began his career at local club Ducor Defenders in Monrovia, Liberia. Ducor Defenders, he developed into one of the country's best players in his position and was subsequently referred to as "Midfield Zah".

Racing Bafoussam Transfer
Zah first Asian experience started in 2005 after excellent performances for Cameroonian club Racing Bafoussam. Persekabpas Pasuruan quickly put in a transfer request for the versatile midfielder and he officially signed with the Indonesian club on January 1, 2005.

Felda United
On 1 January 2014, he signed for Felda United in Malaysia after impressive seasons at Indonesian club Persipura Jayapura. He moved to Felda United which was owned by Federal Land Development Authority of Malaysia (FELDA). Zah made his official debut for Felda United on 9 December 2013 during their pre-season match in Australia ahead of the official start of the league on 12 December 2013.

International career
Zah made his International debut for the Liberia national team on 3 September 2006 playing against Equatorial Guinea where he scored his debut goal in Liberia 2–1 away lost. As of 2016, Zah have made 30 appearances for the Lone Star and with 9 goals to his credit.

Presidential Cup friendly
Zah scored two goals to helped Liberia clinch a 2−0 win over Ghana in an international friendly or 2nd annual President's Cup in Monrovia in September 2012.

Malaysia All Stars XI
On 24 July 2015, Zah was listed among five foreign players from the Malaysian League in the Malaysian All Stars XI squad that played against English Premier League club, Liverpool in a Pre-season and the club Asian Tour at the Bukit Jalil National Stadium in Malaysia. The game ended 1−1.

Style of play
Zah is known for his energy in the midfield and has been compared with ex-Arsenal player Alex Song and various other African midfielders who have much pace and stamina. He has also been called a younger version of Michael Essien because of his hard work in the defensive midfielder role.

International goals

Honours

Club
Sriwijaya
Liga Indonesia (1): 2007–08
Piala Indonesia (3): 2007–08, 2008–09, 2010

Persipura Jayapura
Indonesia Super League (1): 2010–11
Indonesian Inter Island Cup (1): 2011
Indonesia Super League (2): 2012–13

Felda United FC
 Malaysian Premier League: 2014 Runner-up
 FA Cup: 2014 Runner-up
 Malaysian Super League: 2016 Runner-up
 Malaysian Super League: 2017 3rd Place

Individual
Liga Indonesia Best player: 2007–08

References

External links
Zah Rahan Krangar profile - www.indomedia.com

Zah Rahan Krangar History
Zah Rahan Krangar - liga-indonesia.co.id

1989 births
Living people
Liberian footballers
Liberian expatriate footballers
Liberia international footballers
Association football midfielders
Expatriate footballers in Indonesia
Liberian expatriate sportspeople in Indonesia
Indonesian Super League-winning players
Indonesian Premier Division players
Liga 1 (Indonesia) players
SC Young Fellows Juventus players
Sportspeople from Monrovia
Persekabpas Pasuruan players
Sriwijaya F.C. players
Persipura Jayapura players
Expatriate footballers in Malaysia
Liberian expatriate sportspeople in Malaysia